A.C. ChievoVerona played its second consecutive season in Serie A, and nearly equaled 5th place from the 2001-02 Serie A season. The club's second season in the premier division was played without Christian Manfredini and Bernardo Corradi, both ending up with Lazio. Due to passport troubles, it also lost key winger Eriberto, who turned out to be four years older and called Luciano, but had faked his identity since he was 21, in order to participate in a Brazilian youth team.

Despite the squad being thinned out, several key players, including Nicola Legrottaglie, Eugenio Corini and Simone Perrotta remained at the club, and those three proved to be the most important players for Chievo, since the absence of the previous starts hardly mattered in terms of results. In the end, only negative results against Udinese hindered Chievo from a second consecutive UEFA Cup qualification. Its European debut ended in a flop, though, as it lost to unfancied Serbian side Crvena Zvedza in the primary round.

Squad

Goalkeepers
  Cristiano Lupatelli
  Marco Ambrosio

Defenders
  Salvatore Lanna
  Nicola Legrottaglie
  Fabio Moro
  Lorenzo D'Anna
  John Mensah
  Stefano Lorenzi
  Emanuele Pesaresi
  Gianluca Grassadonia
  Maurizio D'Angelo
  Alejandro Ricavar

Midfielders
  Daniele Franceschini
  Simone Perrotta
  Eugenio Corini
  Ivano Della Morte
  Luciano
  Daniel Andersson
  Nikola Lazetić
  Lilian Nalis
  Dario Passoni
  Ivone De Franceschi

Attackers
  Federico Cossato
  Oliver Bierhoff
  Sergio Pellissier
  Massimo Marazzina
  Saša Bjelanović
  Luigi Beghetto
  de Paula

Serie A

Matches

 Lazio-Chievo 2-3
 1-0 Diego Simeone (5)
 1-1 Lorenzo D'Anna (14)
 1-2 Oliver Bierhoff (49)
 2-2 Bernardo Corradi (64)
 2-3 Ivano Della Morte (70)
 Chievo-Brescia 1-2
 0-1 Igli Tare (12)
 1-1 Federico Cossato (29)
 1-2 Anthony Šerić (87)
 Internazionale-Chievo 2-1
 0-1 Massimo Marazzina (3)
 1-1 Christian Vieri (15)
 2-1 Christian Vieri (78 pen)
 Chievo-Modena 2-0
 1-0 Daniele Franceschini (32)
 2-0 Eugenio Corini (47 pen)
 Torino-Chievo 1-0
 1-0 Federico Magallanes (18)
 Chievo-Milan 3-2
 1-0 Massimo Marazzina (22)
 2-0 Oliver Bierhoff (49)
 2-1 Andriy Shevchenko (59)
 3-1 Federico Cossato (83)
 3-2 Jon Dahl Tomasson (90 + 4)
 Parma-Chievo 0-1
 0-1 Sergio Pellissier (90 + 4)
 Chievo-Perugia 3-0
 1-0 Nicola Legrottaglie (25)
 2-0 Ivano Della Morte (28)
 3-0 Eugenio Corini (52 pen)
 Chievo-Atalanta 4-1
 0-1 Luigi Sala (40)
 1-1 Federico Cossato (45)
 2-1 Daniele Franceschini (56)
 3-1 Simone Perrotta (84)
 4-1 Federico Cossato (87)
 Udinese-Chievo 2-1
 1-0 Martin Jørgensen (13)
 2-0 Carsten Jancker (27)
 2-1 Oliver Bierhoff (48)
 Chievo-Empoli 1-0
 1-0 Massimo Marazzina (27)
 Reggina-Chievo 1-1
 1-0 Shunsuke Nakamura (23 pen)
 1-1 Nicola Legrottaglie (49)
 Chievo-Bologna 0-0
 Piacenza-Chievo 0-3
 0-1 Ivano Della Morte (49)
 0-2 Oliver Bierhoff (87)
 0-3 Sergio Pellissier (90 + 1)
 Chievo-Como 2-0
 1-0 Nicola Legrottaglie (64)
 2-0 Sergio Pellissier (73)
 Roma-Chievo 0-1
 0-1 Federico Cossato (89)
 Chievo-Juventus 1-4
 0-1 David Trezeguet (11)
 0-2 Alessandro Del Piero (21 pen)
 0-3 David Trezeguet (23)
 1-3 Federico Cossato (72)
 1-4 David Trezeguet (86 pen)
 Perugia-Chievo 1-0
 1-0 Marco Di Loreto (37)
 Chievo-Lazio 1-1
 1-0 Eugenio Corini (45 pen)
 1-1 Diego Simeone (89)
 Brescia-Chievo 0-0
 Chievo-Internazionale 2-1
 1-0 Eugenio Corini (22 pen)
 2-0 Eugenio Corini (36 pen)
 2-1 Christian Vieri (69)
 Modena-Chievo 1-0
 1-0 Giuseppe Sculli (76)
 Chievo-Torino 3-2
 0-1 Vincenzo Sommense (16)
 1-1 Sergio Pellissier (30)
 1-2 Massimo Donati (39)
 2-2 Federico Cossato (59)
 3-2 Lorenzo D'Anna (63)
 Milan-Chievo 0-0
 Chievo-Parma 0-4
 0-1 Adrian Mutu (6)
 0-2 Hidetoshi Nakata (59)
 0-3 Sabri Lamouchi (67)
 0-4 Alberto Gilardino (90 + 1)
 Atalanta-Chievo 1-0
 1-0 Ousmane Dabo (52)
 Chievo-Udinese 3-0
 1-0 Saša Bjelanović (10)
 2-0 Federico Cossato (37)
 3-0 Sergio Pellissier (68)
 Empoli-Chievo 2-1
 0-1 Saša Bjelanović (8)
 1-1 Antonio Buscè (23)
 2-1 Stefano Lucchini (61)
 Chievo-Reggina 2-1
 1-0 Federico Cossato (24)
 1-1 Federico Cossato (42 og)
 2-1 Nicola Legrottaglie (73)
 Bologna-Chievo 1-1
 1-0 Giuseppe Signori (2)
 1-1 Ivano Della Morte (90 + 4)
 Chievo-Piacenza 3-1
 0-1 Eusebio Di Francesco (5)
 1-1 Ivone De Franceschi (65)
 2-1 Ivone De Franceschi (69)
 3-1 Saša Bjelanović (80)
 Como-Chievo 2-4
 0-1 Daniele Franceschini (10)
 0-2 Luciano (21)
 0-3 Daniele Franceschini (41)
 0-4 Saša Bjelanović (48)
 1-4 Nicola Amoruso (52)
 2-4 Nicola Caccia (73)
 Chievo-Roma 0-0
 Juventus-Chievo 4-3
 1-0 Marcelo Zalayeta (16)
 2-0 Marcelo Zalayeta (57)
 2-1 Oliver Bierhoff (62)
 3-1 David Trezeguet (70)
 3-2 Oliver Bierhoff (74)
 3-3 Oliver Bierhoff (79)
 4-3 Cristian Zenoni (87)

Topscorers
  Federico Cossato 9
  Oliver Bierhoff 7
  Eugenio Corini 5
  Sergio Pellissier 5
  Saša Bjelanović 4
  Daniele Franceschini 4
  Nicola Legrottaglie 4
  Ivano Della Morte 4

References

Sources
RSSSF - Italy 2002/03

A.C. ChievoVerona seasons
Chievo